The 1996–97 Vancouver Canucks season was the team's 27th in the National Hockey League (NHL). The Canucks finished fourth in the division, and ninth in the conference, and failed to make the playoffs for the first time ending a 7 year playoff streaks since 1990.

Off-season

Regular season

Final standings

 
|}

Player statistics

Note: GP = Games played; G = Goals; A = Assists; Pts = Points; +/- = Plus/Minus; PIM = Penalty Minutes

Awards and records

Transactions

Draft picks
Vancouver's draft picks at the 1996 NHL Entry Draft held at the Kiel Center in St. Louis, Missouri.

See also
1996–97 NHL season

References
 

Vancouver Canucks season, 1996-97
Vancouver Canucks seasons
Vancouver C